The Silent Partner or Vitaphone 1250–51: The Silent Partner is a 1931 American short drama black and white film directed by Roy Mack and starring William Gaxton. It is produced by The Vitaphone Corporation.

Plot summary

Cast 
 William Gaxton as Bill, the Nephew
 Shirley Palmer as Bill's Wife
 Frank McGlynn Sr.
 Ed Robbins		
 Roger Gray
 Winifred Harris
 Detmar Poppen

References

External links 
 

American drama short films
1931 short films
1931 drama films
1931 films
American black-and-white films
Films directed by Roy Mack
Films produced by Samuel Sax
Films with screenplays by Rupert Hughes
Vitaphone short films
Films shot in New York City
1930s American films